is a 2011 Japanese documentary film written and directed by Mami Sunada about the illness and death of her father, Tomoaki Sunada.

The film was a box office success in Japan, and has won prizes at the Dubai {Muhr Award) and Chicago International Film Festivals,  and was described as one of the ten best films of the year by The Japan Times.

Reception

References

External links
 
 Interview: Sunada Mami on Filming Her Father's Final Days

Japanese documentary films
Documentary films about death
2011 documentary films
2011 films
2010s Japanese films